The Waterfall is a 1969 novel by British novelist Margaret Drabble. The novel is one of Drabble's more experimental narratives, starting as a third person narrative but quickly dominated by a first person protagonist Jane Gray, to guide the reader through her love affair and life.

Reception
The New York Times reviewer Maureen Howard gave the novel mixed reviews, suggesting that it wasn't artistic enough. Howard writes that the novel is missing a "richness of seemingly effortless design, that is missing in Margaret Drabble's work. Like her heroine, she is still confined in a self-conscious world."

References

Further reading
 
 

1969 British novels
Novels by Margaret Drabble
Weidenfeld & Nicolson books